is a mountain pass on the border of Kanagawa and Shizuoka Prefectures, near Mount Kintoki in Japan.

History
The pass, located on the ancient Tōkaidō highway, was first described in the 8th century anthology Man'yōshū. This pass served as the border between Sagami and Suruga provinces, as well as the main entrance to the Kantō region in Japan. A checkpoint was built in 899, and castle was built in the 16th century, both of which are no longer standing.

Access
 by Car
 Kanagawa Prefecturel Route 78, from Tomei Expressway Oi-Matsuda Interchange.
 Shizuoka prefecturel Route 78, from Tomei Expressway Gotemba Interchange via Gotemba City Hall.
 by Train, Bus and walk
 Hakone Tozan Bus from Shin-Matsuda Station on the Odakyu Line, or Daiyuzan Station on the Daiyuzan Line, to Jizodo, and an hour's walk. Direct operations are available from Daiyuzan Station or Jizodo to Ashigara Man'yo Koen (near this Pass) on Saturday & Holiday, in April and May, October and November.
 90 minute walk from Ashigara Station on the JR Gotemba Line.

See also
 Mount Ashigara
 Kintoki

References

External links
 Ashigara Pass Hiking course 
 Geographical Survey Institute

Mountain passes of Japan